Vanessa is a 1977 German softcore erotic melodrama film starring Olivia Pascal and directed by Hubert Frank. Vanessa was the first movie shown on The Playboy Channel.

Plot
Vanessa Anden (Olivia Pascal) is a misfit student at a Bavarian convent. After the death of her uncle Richard, she travels to Hong Kong to assume ownership of her uncle's estate. When she arrives, Prinz Bandor (Tom Garven), a taxi driver later revealed to be a magician, delivers her to Richard's palatial home. There, she meets Jackie (Uschi Zech), the niece of Richard's attorney and closest friend, Anthony Grüder (Peter M. Krueger). Jackie's sister Cle (Eva Eden) is married to the wealthy Major Kenneth Cooper (Anton Diffring). Cle engages in a series of open extramarital affairs in an attempt to get Kenneth to divorce her.

Vanessa learns she has inherited a chain of bordellos and a large citrus plantation, but the plantation administrator, Adrian (Günter Clemens), claims to be Richard's illegitimate son and has contested the will. Adrian invites Vanessa to the plantation to persuade her to give it to him. He then attempts to rape Vanessa, but Kenneth interrupts him. Adrian's servant Tai-Neh (Eva Leuze), who is in love with Adrian, becomes furiously jealous of Adrian's interest in Vanessa. Tai-Neh uses sympathetic magic to cause Vanessa agony and leave her sick in bed. Jackie, suspecting magic, enlists Prinz Bandor's aid. Bandor perceives Tai-Neh's magic is the source of Vanessa's pain and counters it.

Eventually, the court rejects Adrian's challenge and awards the entire estate to Vanessa. Adrian tries to convince Vanessa he loves her, but Vanessa simply fires him. Vanessa decides to keep the plantation but has Anthony sell all the brothels, thus becoming very wealthy. Kenneth invites Vanessa to her home, drugs her and sexually assaults her. Jackie, Adrian and Cle arrive as he does so, and Adrian rescues Vanessa. Kenneth asks Cle to come back to him, but she refuses. Vanessa hires Adrian to run the plantation again and returns to Europe, leaving open the possibility of a future relationship someday.

Cast
 Olivia Pascal as Vanessa Anden
 Anton Diffring as Major Kenneth Cooper (as Anthony Diffring)
 Günter Clemens as Adrian Dijon
 Uschi Zech as Jackie Grüder
 Eva Eden as Clé Cooper
 Henry Heller
 Eva Leuze as Tai-Neh
 Astrid Boner as Oberin (as Astrid Bohner)
 Gisela Krauss as Hilda
 Peter M. Krueger as Anthony Grüder (as Peter M. Krüger)
 Tom Garven as Prinz Bandor

Production
Director Hubert Frank was a last-minute replacement for the intended director, Siggi Götz. Frank shot the film from an incomplete screenplay, which he largely ignored in favor of improvising much of the movie. Producer Karl Spiehs discovered Olivia Gerlitzki, a medical assistant, and cast her in the lead role as Olivia Pascal.

Reception
Reviewing the film at DVDTalk, Gerry Putzer described "Vanessa" as "[h]ardly a good movie," but "nevertheless watchable" as an artifact of 1970s cinematic erotica. The German film site Filmlexikon called "Vanessa" an "elaborately-arranged and photographed sex film, contentless and speculative."

References

External links
 
 

1977 films
1970s erotic films
German erotic films
West German films
Sexploitation films
Films set on farms
Films set in Hong Kong
Softcore pornography
Films scored by Gerhard Heinz
1970s German-language films
1970s German films